Rippy is a surname. Notable people with the surname include:

J. Fred Rippy (1892–1977), American academic
Leon Rippy (born 1949), American actor
Matt Rippy, American actor
Patsy Rippy, American tennis player
Rebecca Rippy (born 1977), American singer/songwriter
Rodney Allen Rippy (born 1968), American child actor
Stephen Rippy, American composer